The Children Court is an ancillary court of Irish District Court, whose role is to deal with minor offences and most indictable offences where the defendant is below the age of 18.

The Dublin Metropolitan Area has its own permanently sitting Children Court centre in Smithfield, Dublin, while across the rest of the country the Children Court usually sits in the same location as the District Court, but on different times and days.

References

External links
The Courts Service of Ireland

Courts of the Republic of Ireland
Law of the Republic of Ireland
Juvenile courts
Youth in the Republic of Ireland